Jessica Nabongo (born 15 May 1984) is a Ugandan-American travel blogger ​and brand influencer. She is the second Black woman to have travelled to every country after Woni Spotts who traveled to every country and continent in 2018.  On 6 October 2019, she arrived at her final country, the Seychelles. Critics dispute Nabongo's claim because she visited Golan Heights, not Syria.

Early years and education 
She was born in Detroit, Michigan to Ugandan parents. She attended St. John's University in New York City where she obtained a Bachelor of Arts degree in English and then the London School of Economics, where she acquired a Master's degree in international development.

Career 
Nabongo received her first passport at the age of four or five. After completing college, she worked at a pharmaceutical company for two years, taught English in Japan and worked as a consultant for the United Nations' Food and Agriculture Organization, before finally becoming a travel blogger. She founded a company called Jet Black, which organises custom itineraries for small group trips in Africa, as well as selling travel gear such as branded T-shirts and passport covers. She is also a brand influencer, working with hotels and hospitality brands.

World travels 
As of 2016, she had already visited 60 countries. In 2017 she decided to visit all 193 countries in the world. According to a post on her Instagram page, she arrived at the 195th country on her list on 6 October 2019, the Seychelles.

References

Living people
American people of Ugandan descent
Alumni of the London School of Economics
1984 births
Women travel writers